Dataclysm: love, sex, race, and identity is a book by OkCupid founder Christian Rudder that discusses how the vast trove of aggregated online data about individuals helps explain everything from political beliefs to speech patterns. Much of the book details his findings after mining his own dataset in OkCupid.

References

2014 non-fiction books
Crown Publishing Group books